Waswanipi is a Cree community in the Eeyou Istchee territory of central Quebec, Canada, located along Route 113 and near the confluence of the Chibougamau and Waswanipi Rivers. It has a population of 459 people (Canada 2021 Census). Waswanipi is a compound word composed of wâswân (a place to fish at night using a torch) and -pî (lake), meaning "torch-fishing lake" but colloquially translated as "light over the water" referring to the traditional night-time fishing method of luring fish to light by using torches.

The original location of the village was on an island in Lake Waswanipi. It was the site of a Hudson's Bay Company trading post until 1965 when the post was closed. Its residents dispersed until 1978 when the new village of Waswanipi was built about 47 km upstream the Waswanipi River from the former location.

Languages Spoken
Waswanipi is a trilingual community, the majority of its residences speaking the Southern East Cree dialect of the Cree language. Aside from the elderly people, who tend to be monolingual Cree speakers, the majority of the population speaks, in addition to Cree, either English or French, some speaking both.

Education 
The Cree School Board operates two schools: Willie J. Happyjack Memorial School (ᐧᐃᓖ ᒉᐄ ᐦᐋᐲᒑᒃ ᒋᔅᑯᑕᒫᒉᐅᑲᒥᒄ) and Rainbow Elementary School (ᐲᓯᒧᔮᐲ ᒋᔅᑯᑕᒫᒉᐅᑲᒥᒄ), along with Jolina Gull-Blacksmith Memorial School.  Happyjack has 536 students.

See also
Grand Council of the Crees

References

External links
Official Site of Waswanipi
Info on Waswanipi by Municipality of Baie-James

Cree villages in Quebec
Innu communities in Quebec
Hudson's Bay Company trading posts
Eeyou Istchee (territory)